The 2023 Atlantic hurricane season is the upcoming Atlantic Ocean tropical cyclone season in the Northern Hemisphere. The season officially begins on June 1, and ends on November 30. These dates, adopted by convention, historically describe the period in each year when most subtropical or tropical cyclogenesis occurs in the Atlantic Ocean (over 97%). The National Hurricane Center (NHC) will begin issuing regular Tropical Weather Outlooks on May 15, about two weeks prior to the start of the season.

Seasonal forecasts 

In advance of, and during, each hurricane season, several forecasts of hurricane activity are issued by national meteorological services, scientific agencies, and noted hurricane experts. These include forecasters from the United States National Oceanic and Atmospheric Administration (NOAA)'s Climate Prediction Center, Tropical Storm Risk (TSR), the United Kingdom's Met Office (UKMO), and Philip J. Klotzbach, William M. Gray and their associates at Colorado State University (CSU). The forecasts include weekly and monthly changes in significant factors that help determine the number of tropical storms, hurricanes, and major hurricanes within a particular year. According to NOAA and CSU, the average Atlantic hurricane season between 1991 and 2020 contained roughly 14 tropical storms, seven hurricanes, three major hurricanes, and an accumulated cyclone energy (ACE) index of 74–126 units. Broadly speaking, ACE is a measure of the power of a tropical or subtropical storm multiplied by the length of time it existed. NOAA typically categorizes a season as above-average, average, or below-average based on the cumulative ACE index, but the number of tropical storms, hurricanes, and major hurricanes within a hurricane season is sometimes also considered.

Pre-season forecasts 
On December 6, 2022, Tropical Storm Risk released their early prediction about the 2023 season. TSR expects the season to be 15% below average and for there to be 13 named storms, six hurricanes, and three major hurricanes.

Systems

Other system 

The NHC noted that the low exhibited thunderstorm activity near its center, but assessed its probability of transitioning into tropical or subtropical cyclone as being near zero percent. Designated by the NHC as Invest 90L, the storm prompted Environment Canada to issue wind warnings for parts of Nova Scotia and Newfoundland as the storm approached the Cabot Strait. The system moved ashore eastern Nova Scotia as a slightly weaker storm on the morning of January 17. Meteorologist Rick Knabb, former director of the NHC, noted that the system may have been a subtropical cyclone.

Storm names 

The following list of names will be used for named storms that form in the North Atlantic in 2023. Retired names, if any, will be announced by the World Meteorological Organization in the spring of 2024. The names not retired from this list will be used again in the 2029 season. This is the same list used in the 2017 season, with the exceptions of Harold, Idalia, Margot, and Nigel, which replaced Harvey, Irma, Maria, and Nate, respectively.

Season effects 
This is a table of all of the storms that have formed in the 2023 Atlantic hurricane season. It includes their duration, names, intensities, areas affected, damages, and death totals. Deaths in parentheses are additional and indirect (an example of an indirect death would be a traffic accident), but were still related to that storm. Damage and deaths include totals while the storm was extratropical, a wave, or a low, and all of the damage figures are in 2023 USD.

See also 

 Weather of 2023
 Tropical cyclones in 2023
 Atlantic hurricane season
 2023 Pacific hurricane season
 2023 Pacific typhoon season
 2023 North Indian Ocean cyclone season
 South-West Indian Ocean cyclone seasons: 2022–23, 2023–24
 Australian region cyclone seasons: 2022–23, 2023–24
 South Pacific cyclone seasons: 2022–23, 2023–24

Notes

References

External links 

 National Hurricane Center Website
 National Hurricane Center's Atlantic Tropical Weather Outlook
 Tropical Cyclone Formation Probability Guidance Product

 
Atlantic hurricane seasons
Tropical cyclones in 2023